"Spock's Brain" is the third season premiere episode of the American science fiction television series Star Trek. Written by Gene L. Coon (under the pseudonym Lee Cronin) and directed by Marc Daniels, it was first broadcast on September 20, 1968.

In the episode, an alien female played by Marj Dusay beams aboard the Enterprise and, after incapacitating the rest of the crew, surgically removes Spock's brain. Captain Kirk and the crew have just hours to locate and restore it before Spock's body dies. The episode is widely regarded as the worst episode of the series.

It was the first episode to air after NBC moved the show from 8:30 P.M. to 10 P.M. on Friday nights.

Plot
The Federation starship  USS Enterprise, under the command of Captain Kirk, encounters an alien ship, from which a mysterious woman beams onto the Enterprise bridge. She stuns the entire crew then examines each of them, taking particular interest in the Vulcan First Officer Spock. When the crew awakens, Chief Medical Officer Dr. McCoy finds Spock in sick bay with his brain surgically removed. Because of his unusual Vulcan physiology, Spock's body can be kept alive in this state for no more than twenty-four hours, giving Captain Kirk that much time to recover his stolen brain.

The Enterprise follows the alien ship's ion trail to the sixth planet of the Sigma Draconis system, a harsh world in the middle of an ice age. A band of male inhabitants attack the landing party, and a captured attacker warns Kirk about the "others", also known as "the givers of pain and delight". Kirk asks about the females of his kind, but is met only with bewilderment.

The landing party is joined by Dr. McCoy, accompanied by Spock's mobile body, controlled by a device McCoy has fashioned. The party travels deep underground and encounters a woman named Luma. When questioned, Luma shows the mentality of a child. Spock's voice is heard through a communicator, but before the conversation goes further, Kirk and his party are captured. The party is brought before the leader of the women, Kara, the same woman who appeared on the Enterprise bridge. Kirk demands to know what they have done with Spock's brain, but Kara claims not to understand what a brain is, exclaiming "Brain and brain! What is brain?" As they try to explain the function of a brain, she realizes that what they are seeking is the "Controller", on which the underground civilization is completely dependent.

The landing party escapes and follow Spock's signals to a control room where his brain has been placed. Kara tells them that the skills needed to remove a brain were provided by a machine called the "Teacher", and that knowledge so obtained lasts no more than three hours. McCoy decides to use the Teacher himself, and then quickly begins the procedure to restore Spock's brain. McCoy's new knowledge begins to fade before the operation is complete, but Spock provides assistance after McCoy reestablishes Spock's ability to speak.

Without their Controller, Kara fears for the women's existence. Kirk assures Kara that the men and women can learn to survive together on the surface. Spock begins a long winded history of the culture of Sigma Draconis VI, much to the dismay of McCoy.

Production
The episode was written by former Star Trek producer Gene L. Coon under the pen name "Lee Cronin".

Reception 
The episode is generally regarded by most fans, and those who took part in its production, as the worst episode of the series. William Shatner called this one of the series' worst episodes, calling the episode's plot a "tribute" to NBC executives who slashed the show's budget and placed it in a bad time slot. Leonard Nimoy wrote: "Frankly, during the entire shooting of that episode, I was embarrassed—a feeling that overcame me many times during the final season of Star Trek."

Zack Handlen of The A.V. Club gave the episode a "D" rating, describing the writing as bad and repetitive and the direction as weak. He added that it had its funny moments and some parts had "a lumpy B-movie charm".

In his book What Were They Thinking? The 100 Dumbest Events in Television History, author David Hofstede ranked the episode at #71 on the list.

A device similar to that used to remotely operate Spock's brainless body is used in the episode "The Magnificent Ferengi" of Star Trek: Deep Space Nine to animate a cadaver.

Swedish synthpop band S.P.O.C.K has featured "Mr. Spock's Brain" on their 1993 album "Five Year Mission".

The rock band Phish performs a song entitled "Spock's Brain".

The episode was referenced in Modern Principles: Microeconomics by Tyler Cowen and Alex Tabarrok of George Mason University as an example of how it is virtually impossible to have a command economy, in that not even Spock's brain could run an economy.

Star Trek co-producer Robert H. Justman  recalled in the book Inside Star Trek The Real Story that he was the person who suggested that Spock's brain, after being rescued by the Enterprise crew, actually "takes over during surgery and instructs Dr. McCoy exactly how to go about reinserting it back where it came from - inside Spock's skull".

As of 2022 the episode has an IMDb weighted score of 5.6/10.

In 2012, The A.V. Club ranked this episode as one of top ten "must see" episodes of the original series.

In 2013, Wired magazine ranked this episode one of the top ten most underrated episodes of the original television series, noting that despite it being regarded as the worst episode it occupies a special place in Star Trek lore. However, they also suggested this episode was skippable in their binge-watching guide for the original series in 2015.

In 2016, SyFy included this episode in a group of Star Trek franchise episodes they felt were commonly disliked but "deserved a second chance".

In 2017, this episode was rated the third-worst episode of all episodes of the Star Trek franchise, including the later series but before Star Trek: Discovery, by ScreenRant. In 2018, CBR included this episode in a list of Star Trek episodes that are "so bad they must be seen".  A ranking of every episode of the original series by Hollywood, placed this episode 78th out of 79 episodes. CBS News listed "Spock's Brain" as one of the worst in the original series. Digital Fox ranked "Spock's Brain" as the number-one worst episode of all Star Trek up to 2018.

In 2017, Den of Geek ranked this episode as the second "best worst" Star Trek episode of the original series.

Releases 
This episode was released in Japan on December 21, 1993 as part of the complete season 3 LaserDisc set, Star Trek: Original Series log.3. A trailer for this and the other episodes was also included, and the episode had English and Japanese audio tracks.

See also
 "Machine Made", a 1951 short story written by J. T. McIntosh
 Brain in a vat

References

External links

"Spock's Brain" Side-by-side comparisons of the remastered version at TrekMovie.com

Star Trek: The Original Series (season 3) episodes
1968 American television episodes
Brain transplantation in fiction
Television episodes written by Gene L. Coon
Television episodes directed by Marc Daniels